Launch Complex B or LC-B at the Point Arguello Naval Air Station in California, United States was a launch complex which was used for twenty three sounding rocket launches between 1960 and 1963. Astrobee-1500, Deacon-Arrow, Kiva-Hopi, Nike-Cajun, Nike-Viper, Terrier-Asp rockets were launched from the complex whilst it was active.

The complex was transferred to the Vandenberg Air Force Base as a result of a merger between it and Point Arguello in 1964, however by that time it was already inactive.

Launch history

References

Vandenberg Space Force Base